Julianne Séguin (born November 7, 1996) is a Canadian pair skater. With Charlie Bilodeau, she is the 2016 Skate America champion, the 2015 World Junior silver medallist, the 2014 Junior Grand Prix Final champion, and a three-time Canadian national medallist. The pair represented Canada at the 2018 Winter Olympics, finishing 9th.

Personal life 
Julianne Séguin was born on November 7, 1996, in Montreal, Quebec, Canada. She studied at a Boucherville high school in a Sports-études program. She speaks French and English.

Skating career

Single skating 
Séguin began learning to skate when she was five or six years old.

As a single skater, Séguin won the junior bronze medal at the 2012 Canadian Championships and began competing on the ISU Junior Grand Prix series in autumn 2012. After placing sixth on the senior level at the 2013 Canadians, she was assigned to the 2013 Four Continents Championships and finished 11th in her senior international debut.

Séguin was assigned to represent Canada in ladies' singles at the 2014 World Junior Championships. She withdrew after sustaining a back injury in practice. The following season, she won the bronze medal at an ISU Challenger Series event, the 2014 Skate Canada Autumn Classic.

Beginning of pair skating career 
Séguin began competing as a pairs skater with Andrew Evans around 2011. In January 2012, they competed on the senior level at the Canadian Championships and placed ninth.

Séguin teamed up with Charlie Bilodeau in November 2012.

2013–2014 season
Séguin/Bilodeau debuted internationally in autumn 2013. Competing in the 2013–14 ISU Junior Grand Prix series, they placed fourth in the Czech Republic and fifth in Belarus. They won the junior silver medal at the 2014 Canadian Championships and were assigned to represent Canada at the 2014 World Junior Championships. The pair withdrew due to Séguin's back injury.

2014–2015 season
During the 2014 JGP series, Séguin/Bilodeau outscored Russia's Lina Fedorova / Maxim Miroshkin for the gold medal in Ostrava, Czech Republic. Upon winning another gold in Dresden, Germany, the pair qualified for the JGP Final. At the latter event, held in December 2014 in Barcelona, they placed first in both segments and won the gold medal by a margin of 9.79 points over Fedorova/Miroshkin.

In January 2015, Séguin/Bilodeau took the senior bronze medal at the Canadian Championships and were named in Canada's teams to the junior and senior World Championships. In February, they were awarded the silver medal at Junior Worlds in Tallinn, Estonia, having placed second to China's Yu Xiaoyu / Jin Yang. In March, they ranked tenth in both segments and finished eighth overall at the World Championships in Shanghai, China.

2015–2016 season
Séguin/Bilodeau won silver at the 2016 Canadian Nationals. While practicing a throw jump in early February, she injured her ankle, resulting in torn ligaments and a bone contusion which would take two to three months to heal. The pair withdrew from the 2016 Four Continents. They later withdrew from 2016 Worlds as well, stating that the injury was not fully healed and they had missed many practices.

2016–2017 season
Séguin/Bilodeau won the 2016 CS Autumn Classic International and 2016 Skate America. They finished 5th at the 2016 Rostelecom Cup and 2016–17 Grand Prix Final. Séguin sustained a concussion on December 24, 2016, and did not resume training until February 1, 2017. As a result, the pair withdrew from the 2017 Canadian Championships. They placed 11th at the 2017 World Championships in Helsinki, Finland.

Séguin sustained two further concussions – the second occurred at an ice show in April and the third while practicing a lift in July 2017. Bilodeau underwent a knee operation in June 2017.

2017–2018 season
Séguin/Bilodeau began their season with bronze at the 2017 CS Autumn Classic International. Their Grand Prix results – 5th at the 2017 Rostelecom Cup and 4th at the 2017 NHK Trophy – were insufficient to qualify to the Grand Prix Final. At the Rostelecom Cup, Séguin experienced blurred vision, dizziness, and nausea. Her concussion-related symptoms continued until December and in a later interview she said that, with the Olympics approaching, she took risks that she would not normally have taken.

In January, Séguin/Bilodeau won the silver medal at the 2018 Canadian Championships, having placed second in both segments, and were nominated to represent Canada at the Olympics. The two placed 12th in the short, 8th in the free, and 9th overall at the 2018 Winter Olympics, which took place in February in Pyeongchang, South Korea. The pair had less success at the 2018 World Championships in Milan, Italy. Ranked 22nd in the short program, they would not qualify to the free skate.

Retirement
Séguin/Bilodeau were invited to the 2018 Grand Prix of Helsinki and 2018 Internationaux de France. They planned to use "Groove Is in the Heart" by Deee-Lite for the short program and "Wicked Game" by Theory of a Deadman for the free skate. However, in mid-July 2018, Bilodeau decided to dissolve their partnership.

In December 2018, Séguin said that she had returned to the ice a couple of weeks earlier, following a pause during which she questioned her future in skating. She stated that her aim was to be prepared for tryouts in January. However, ongoing health issues made this impossible, and Séguin retired from competition. Interviewed in 2021, she was still suffering from long-term effects of her series of concussions in 2017, which had been exacerbated by not following federation guidelines for safe return to the ice following injuries.  She considered that Bilodeau's ending of their partnership may have inadvertently saved her life.

Programs

With Bilodeau

Single skating

Competitive highlights 
GP: Grand Prix; CS: Challenger Series; JGP: Junior Grand Prix

Pairs with Bilodeau

Pairs with Evans

Ladies' singles

References

External links 

 
 

1996 births
Canadian female pair skaters
Canadian female single skaters
Living people
Figure skaters from Montreal
Figure skaters at the 2018 Winter Olympics
Olympic figure skaters of Canada
World Junior Figure Skating Championships medalists